For information about the former St Kilda player named Peter Bell, see Peter R. Bell.

Peter Francis Bell (born 1 March 1976) is a former Australian rules footballer who played for the Fremantle Football Club and the North Melbourne Football Club in the Australian Football League. He played as a rover (or follower). A former captain of the Fremantle Football Club, Bell was twice named as a member of the All-Australian Team. He was an acclaimed ball-winner and had more than 30 possessions in a game on 39 occasions in his career.

Bell has played more games and the third most goals of any AFL player born outside of Australia.

Early life
Bell was born in Jeju Island, South Korea, the son of a Korean mother, Kyung Ae and a Native Americans father of Navajo descent. In 1979, he was adopted by an Australian couple who were in South Korea as Christian missionaries. 

Bell spent his formative years in Kojonup, Western Australia and began playing junior football at the age of 10 with Kojonup Cougars Junior Football Club. As well as playing, he was a regular scoreboard attendant and also boundary umpired. At the age of 13, he broke his leg which had complications and required additional resetting. 

He was educated at Aquinas College, Perth where he was a boarder. At Aquinas, he continued playing junior football from age 15 where he excelled, earning selection in the WA junior representative team. In 1994, he joined the South Fremantle Football Club and had an immediate impact being named best and fairest. Despite being considered short by AFL standards at the time he was shortly after selected in the inaugural Fremantle Dockers AFL club list drawn from the local clubs.

Bell became one of the first two players signed by the Fremantle Dockers, which made its debut in the Australian Football League the following year.

AFL career

Fremantle (1995)
Despite kicking two goals with his first two kicks in AFL football, Bell failed to make an impression on Dockers' coach Gerard Neesham, who regarded him as too slow a runner to be a successful AFL player. Bell was selected for only two games in 1995.

North Melbourne (1996–2000)
He was delisted at the end of that season, worked hard to improve his leg speed, and was picked up in the 1996 Pre-season draft, by North Melbourne, where he achieved regular selection and acclaim for his courageous, energetic and skilled performances under coach Denis Pagan. Bell was a premiership player with the Kangaroos in 1996 and 1999, and was named an All-Australian on the bench in 1999.  He scored four goals and had 31 possessions in the 1999 Grand Final to be one of the Roos best on the day.  In 2000, he won the North Melbourne best and fairest award, the Syd Barker Medal.

Fremantle (2001–2008)
 At the end of 2000, Fremantle sought his return and Bell was traded back to his original club. As it happened, 2001 was a disastrous season for the Dockers, winning the "wooden spoon" and culminating in the dismissal of coach Damian Drum. Bell won the Doig Medal for the Dockers' best and fairest player that year, and was one of the very few shining lights in a season where the Dockers recorded just two victories. These two wins were in part due to outstanding performances from Bell, who gathered thirty-eight possessions and two goals against Hawthorn in round 18, and forty-four disposals and three goals against Adelaide in round 22. The following year he was appointed captain and in 2003 the club made the finals for the first time. Bell was once again an All-Australian, this time as a follower.

He continued his good form into 2004, winning another Doig Medal.  However, Fremantle's team performances were not as good, and in both 2004 and 2005 they narrowly missed making the finals.  2006 started poorly, but Bell was a leading player in Freo's record setting 9-game winning streak to finish in the top four for the first time, and also a member of the team that beat Melbourne in the second semi final to record Fremantle's first ever finals game win.

Despite offering to hand over the captaincy to Matthew Pavlich in 2003, he remained captain for five seasons until the end of the 2006 season.

At Subiaco Oval, enthusiastic supporters rang a bell (a play on his surname) whenever Bell got a possession. Bell has the exact bell which was rung so enthusiastically on his sideboard in his current home. He was president of the AFL Players Association from 2003 until the beginning of 2007.

Bell announced his immediate retirement on 7 July 2008, having played his last game in the club's Round 14 loss to Essendon. He played 286 games with North Melbourne and Fremantle.

Playing statistics

|- style="background-color: #EAEAEA"
! scope="row" style="text-align:center" | 1995
|
| 32 || 2 || 2 || 0 || 5 || 4 || 9 || 0 || 1 || 1.0 || 0.0 || 2.5 || 2.0 || 4.5 || 0.0 || 0.5
|-
! scope="row" style="text-align:center" | 1996
|
| 26 || 23 || 23 || 11 || 187 || 128 || 315 || 36 || 21 || 1.0 || 0.5 || 8.1 || 5.6 || 13.7 || 1.6 || 0.9
|- style="background:#eaeaea;"
! scope="row" style="text-align:center" | 1997
|
| 26 || 25 || 24 || 16 || 281 || 182 || 463 || 69 || 36 || 1.0 || 0.6 || 11.2 || 7.3 || 18.5 || 2.8 || 1.4
|-
! scope="row" style="text-align:center" | 1998
|
| 26 || 25 || 17 || 14 || 327 || 215 || 542 || 67 || 43 || 0.7 || 0.6 || 13.1 || 8.6 || 21.7 || 2.7 || 1.7
|- style="background:#eaeaea;"
! scope="row" style="text-align:center" | 1999
|
| 26 || 25 || 32 || 20 || 427 || 195 || 622 || 96 || 48 || 1.3 || 0.8 || 17.1 || 7.8 || 24.9 || 3.8 || 1.9
|-
! scope="row" style="text-align:center" | 2000
|
| 26 || 25 || 24 || 19 || 387 || 262 || 649 || 107 || 75 || 1.0 || 0.8 || 15.5 || 10.5 || 26.0 || 4.3 || 3.0
|- style="background:#eaeaea;"
! scope="row" style="text-align:center" | 2001
|
| 32 || 19 || 14 || 10 || 313 || 214 || 527 || 83 || 52 || 0.7 || 0.5 || 16.5 || 11.3 || 27.7 || 4.4 || 2.7
|-
! scope="row" style="text-align:center" | 2002
|
| 32 || 22 || 11 || 10 || 308 || 264 || 572 || 77 || 47 || 0.5 || 0.5 || 14.0 || 12.0 || 26.0 || 3.5 || 2.1
|- style="background:#eaeaea;"
! scope="row" style="text-align:center" | 2003
|
| 32 || 23 || 20 || 9 || 354 || 242 || 596 || 111 || 72 || 0.9 || 0.4 || 15.4 || 10.5 || 25.9 || 4.8 || 3.1
|-
! scope="row" style="text-align:center" | 2004
|
| 32 || 21 || 22 || 12 || 279 || 215 || 494 || 81 || 56 || 1.0 || 0.6 || 13.3 || 10.2 || 23.5 || 3.9 || 2.7
|- style="background:#eaeaea;"
! scope="row" style="text-align:center" | 2005
|
| 32 || 18 || 12 || 8 || 251 || 171 || 422 || 91 || 69 || 0.7 || 0.4 || 13.9 || 9.5 || 23.4 || 5.1 || 3.8
|-
! scope="row" style="text-align:center" | 2006
|
| 32 || 23 || 14 || 12 || 306 || 236 || 542 || 116 || 76 || 0.6 || 0.5 || 13.3 || 10.3 || 23.6 || 5.0 || 3.3
|- style="background:#eaeaea;"
! scope="row" style="text-align:center" | 2007
|
| 32 || 22 || 28 || 12 || 266 || 218 || 484 || 102 || 63 || 1.3 || 0.5 || 12.1 || 9.9 || 22.0 || 4.6 || 2.9
|-
! scope="row" style="text-align:center" | 2008
|Fremantle
| 32 || 13 || 7 || 4 || 127 || 157 || 284 || 54 || 41 || 0.5 || 0.3 || 9.8 || 12.1 || 21.8 || 4.2 || 3.2
|- class="sortbottom"
! colspan=3| Career
! 286
! 250
! 157
! 3818
! 2703
! 6521
! 1090
! 700
! 0.9
! 0.5
! 13.3
! 9.5
! 22.8
! 3.8
! 2.4
|}

Post player career

Bell was educated at the University of Western Australia, where he obtained a Bachelor of Laws.

In 2013, Bell joined radio broadcaster 6PR as host of the afternoon slot, alongside his match day special comments for AFL games on the station. In 2016, he moved to ABC Radio Perth to host the weekday breakfast program. He also did some AFL coverage for the Seven Network.

In September 2018, Bell was appointed general manager of the Fremantle Football Club, and resigned from his radio and television roles.

References

External links

 

1976 births
Living people
VFL/AFL players born outside Australia
Australian rules footballers from Western Australia
Australian people of American descent
Australian people of Korean descent
Fremantle Football Club players
North Melbourne Football Club players
North Melbourne Football Club Premiership players
South Fremantle Football Club players
South Korean people of American descent
South Korean emigrants to Australia
Western Australian State of Origin players
All-Australians (AFL)
Doig Medal winners
Syd Barker Medal winners
People educated at Aquinas College, Perth
University of Western Australia alumni
Australian Football Hall of Fame inductees
West Australian Football Hall of Fame inductees
Fremantle Football Club captains
Australian radio presenters
Australia international rules football team players
Australian adoptees
Fremantle Football Club administrators
Two-time VFL/AFL Premiership players